Anthony Perosh (born 5 October 1972) is a retired Australian professional mixed martial artist who competed in the Light Heavyweight division of the Ultimate Fighting Championship.

Background
Perosh was born and raised in Sydney, Australia and is of Croatian descent, as both of his parents are Croatian immigrants. Perosh began training in martial arts while doing security work to help pay for college tuition. The training would help him in working security and he began his training in 1995 with Paul Zadro, when he was 23 years old. This original training was in Kempo Karate and Muay Thai, before he learned about Brazilian jiu-jitsu. In 1997 Perosh moved to Dallas, Texas to train with Carlos Machado (A World BJJ Champion) for over two years. In 2003, Machado presented Perosh with a black belt in Machado Brazilian jiu-jitsu. Perosh is now a fourth degree black belt in Brazilian jiu-jitsu, still under Machado. Perosh trained to compete in mixed martial arts after he received his black belt when he was 31 years old.

Mixed martial arts career

Early career
Perosh made his professional mixed martial arts debut on 29 November 2003 defeating Api Hemara by first round rear-naked choke submission. Perosh went on to fight two more times that night, winning both bouts by submission. He was invited to the UFC after compiling a 5–1 record with his only loss coming to 11–0 Sam Nest, by the way of decision.

Ultimate Fighting Championship
His UFC debut came not only against a fellow ADCC Submission Wrestling World Championship grappler, but against an ADCC Champion in Jeff Monson at UFC 61. With both Monson and Perosh's Brazilian jiu-jitsu skills being cancelled out, the fight saw Monson instead win by technical knockout that subsequently led to a fight with Tim Sylvia for the UFC Heavyweight Championship.

His next fight came against Christian Wellisch at UFC 66 in a bloody brawl that saw both fighters knock each other down along with Perosh earning more takedowns while Wellisch landed more strikes. The win could have gone to either fighter, but the judges gave it unanimously to Wellisch. Perosh was released from the UFC following the fight.

Post-UFC
On 22 May 2009, Perosh won the quarter-final match against Nate Carey at CFC 8. He also won the semi-final match against Dave Frendin at CFC 9 on 11 July 2009. On 21 August 2009, Perosh was defeated by future UFC veteran James Te-Huna in the finals, at CFC 10. Te-Huna controversially stomped on Perosh when he was down at the end of the fight but was not given a punishment.

Return to Ultimate Fighting Championship
At UFC 110, the UFC's debut event in Australia on 20 February 2010, Perosh made his return to the UFC filling in as a late replacement for Ben Rothwell against legendary kickboxer and former 2006 Pride World Grand Prix Openweight Champion Mirko Cro Cop on a mere two days notice. Doctors called an end to the fight with Cro Cop at the end of the second round, as Perosh was bleeding from a cut sustained midway through the 2nd round by a vicious elbow from his opponent. Although he lost, Perosh was given a four-fight contract with the UFC for stepping in on late notice against such a great opponent. On 27 March 2010, Perosh announced he would be undergoing knee surgery in the coming weeks and that he hoped that his next fight in the UFC would take place some time in September 2010.

In his light heavyweight debut at UFC 127, Perosh quickly defeated English fighter Tom Blackledge to finally capture his first win in the UFC. He won the fight by rear-naked choke submission at 2:45 of the first round in front of his hometown crowd in Sydney, Australia; he stated post-fight that he feels much stronger at light heavyweight and would like to see how far he can go in his new weight class.

Perosh was scheduled to face Krzysztof Soszynski on 11 June 2011 at UFC 131. However, Perosh was forced from the bout with an eye injury and was replaced by Igor Pokrajac.

On 5 November 2011 at UFC 138 Perosh defeated Cyrille Diabaté via submission (rear-naked choke) at 3:09 of round two to gain his second UFC win in succession.

Perosh next faced promotional newcomer Nick Penner on 3 March 2012 at UFC on FX 2. He won the fight via TKO in the first round.

Perosh faced Ryan Jimmo on 21 July 2012 at UFC 149, losing via KO in 7 seconds.

Perosh was expected to face Joey Beltran on 15 December 2012 at UFC on FX 6. However, Perosh was forced from the bout with a toe injury and replaced by Igor Pokrajac.

In his sixth fight for the promotion since his return, Perosh faced Vinny Magalhães on 3 August 2013 at UFC 163. He won the fight via knockout just 10 seconds in the first round. This earned Perosh his first Knockout of the Night bonus award.

Perosh faced Ryan Bader on 7 December 2013 at UFC Fight Night 33. He lost the fight via unanimous decision (30–27, 30–27, and 30–26).

Perosh was expected to face Gian Villante on 28 June 2014 at UFC Fight Night 43.  However, Perosh was forced out of the bout with an injury and was replaced by Sean O'Connell.

Perosh faced Guto Inocente at UFC Fight Night 55 on 8 November 2014. He won the fight via submission in the first round.

Perosh faced Sean O'Connell on 10 May 2015 at UFC Fight Night 65. He lost the fight via TKO in the first round.

Perosh faced Gian Villante on 15 November 2015 at UFC 193. He lost the fight via knockout in the first round.

Perosh announced his retirement from active competition in January 2016.

Personal life
Perosh previously ran Sinosic Perosh Martial Arts (SPMA), with his business and training partner, former UFC veteran Elvis Sinosic in Sydney.
Perosh now currently runs Team Perosh Mixed Martial Arts which was established in late 2017, a martial arts school located in Sydney, Australia teaching Brazilian Jiu Jitsu, Muay Thai, kickboxing, mixed martial arts, wrestling. Both Instructors decided to open their Individual Gyms after they agreed that one instructor should be at one location to pay closer attention to their students.

His nickname, "The Hippo," derived from his specific jiu-jitsu game; his use of pressure from the top position made his training partners frustrated and say: "Get off me you hippo!".

Championships and accomplishments

Mixed martial arts
Cage Fighting Championships
CFC Light Heavyweight Tournament Runner Up
Ultimate Fighting Championship
Knockout of the Night (One time)

Grappling and Brazilian jiu-jitsu
World Jiu-Jitsu Championship
1999 World Jiu-Jitsu Championship Bronze Medalist
2003 World Jiu-Jitsu Championship Bronze Medalist
Pan American Championship
2000 Pan American Silver Medalist
ADCC Submission Wrestling World Championship
5X ADCC World Championship Qualifier
ADCC 2009 South Pacific Champion
Australian National Brazilian Jiu-Jitsu Championships
10X Australian National Brazilian Jiu-Jitsu Champion

Mixed martial arts record

|-
|Loss
|align=center| 15–10
|Gian Villante
|KO (punch)
|UFC 193
|
|align=center|1
|align=center|2:56
|Melbourne, Australia
| 
|-
|Loss
|align=center| 15–9
|Sean O'Connell
|TKO (punches)
|UFC Fight Night: Miocic vs. Hunt
| 
|align=center|1
|align=center|0:56
|Adelaide, Australia
|
|-
| Win
| align=center| 15–8
| Guto Inocente
| Submission (rear-naked choke)
| UFC Fight Night: Rockhold vs. Bisping
|  
| align=center| 1
| align=center| 3:46
| Sydney, Australia
| 
|-
| Loss
| align=center| 14–8
| Ryan Bader
| Decision (unanimous)
| UFC Fight Night: Hunt vs. Bigfoot
|  
| align=center| 3
| align=center| 5:00
| Brisbane, Australia
| 
|-
| Win
| align=center| 14–7
| Vinny Magalhães
| KO (punches)
| UFC 163
|  
| align=center| 1
| align=center| 0:14
| Rio de Janeiro, Brazil
| 
|-
| Loss
| align=center| 13–7
| Ryan Jimmo
| KO (punch)
| UFC 149
|  
| align=center| 1
| align=center| 0:07
| Calgary, Alberta, Canada
| 
|-
| Win
| align=center| 13–6
| Nick Penner
| TKO (punches)
| UFC on FX: Alves vs. Kampmann
|  
| align=center| 1
| align=center| 4:59
| Sydney, Australia
| 
|-
| Win
| align=center| 12–6
| Cyrille Diabaté
| Submission (rear-naked choke)
| UFC 138
| 
| align=center| 2
| align=center| 3:09
| Birmingham, England
| 
|-
| Win
| align=center| 11–6
| Tom Blackledge
| Submission (rear-naked choke)
| UFC 127
| 
| align=center| 1
| align=center| 2:45
| Sydney, Australia
|
|-
| Loss
| align=center| 10–6
| Mirko Cro Cop
| TKO (doctor stoppage)
| UFC 110
| 
| align=center| 2
| align=center| 5:00
| Sydney, Australia
| 
|-
| Win
| align=center| 10–5
| Kym Robinson
| TKO (punches)
| Rize 3: Ascension 
| 
| align=center| 1
| align=center| N/A
| Brisbane, Australia
| 
|-
| Loss
| align=center| 9–5
| James Te Huna
| KO (punches)
| CFC 10: Light Heavyweight Grand Prix Finals
| 
| align=center| 1
| align=center| 2:21
| Sydney, Australia
| 
|-
| Win
| align=center| 9–4
| David Frendin
| Submission (knees)
| CFC 9: Fighters Paradise
| 
| align=center| 1
| align=center| 2:45
| Carrara, Australia
| 
|-
| Win
| align=center| 8–4
| Nate Carey
| TKO (punches)
| CFC 8: Light Heavyweight Grand Prix
| 
| align=center| 1
| align=center| 4:16
| Sydney, Australia
| 
|-
| Win
| align=center| 7–4
| Bryan Harper
| Submission (rear-naked choke)
| CFC 6: Eliminator
| 
| align=center| 2
| align=center| 4:04
| Sydney, Australia
| 
|-
| Loss
| align=center| 6–4
| Moise Rimbon
| KO (flying knee)
| Cage Fighting Championships 3
| 
| align=center| 1
| align=center| 4:11
| Sydney, Australia
| 
|-
| Win
| align=center| 6–3
| Carlo Lattore
| TKO (punches)
| Cage Fighting Championships 2
| 
| align=center| 1
| align=center| 4:31
| Sydney, Australia
| 
|-
| Loss
| align=center| 5–3
| Christian Wellisch
| Decision (unanimous)
| UFC 66
| 
| align=center| 3
| align=center| 5:00
| Las Vegas, Nevada, United States
| 
|-
| Loss
| align=center| 5–2
| Jeff Monson
| TKO (punches)
| UFC 61
| 
| align=center| 1
| align=center| 2:42
| Las Vegas, Nevada, United States
| 
|-
| Win
| align=center| 5–1
| Ross Dallow
| Submission (rear-naked choke)
| Warriors Realm 5
| 
| align=center| 1
| align=center| 2:25
| Bokarina, Australia
| 
|-
| Win
| align=center| 4–1
| Matt Foki
| Submission (arm-triangle choke)
| Spartan Reality Fight 10
| 
| align=center| 1
| align=center| 3:43
| Gold Coast, Australia
| 
|-
| Loss
| align=center| 3–1
| Sam Nest
| Decision (unanimous)
| Shooto Australia: NHB
| 
| align=center| 3
| align=center| 5:00
| Melbourne, Australia
| 
|-
| Win
| align=center| 3–0
| David Frendin
| Submission (choke)
| Spartan Reality Fight 8
| 
| align=center| 1
| align=center| 2:26
| Gold Coast, Australia
| 
|-
| Win
| align=center| 2–0
| Mal Foki
| Submission (punches)
| Spartan Reality Fight 8
| 
| align=center| 1
| align=center| 3:31
| Gold Coast, Australia
| 
|-
| Win
| align=center| 1–0
| Api Hemara
| Submission (rear-naked choke)
| Spartan Reality Fight 8
| 
| align=center| 1
| align=center| 1:13
| Gold Coast, Australia
|

See also
 List of current UFC fighters
 List of male mixed martial artists

References

External links
Official UFC Profile

1972 births
Australian male mixed martial artists
Light heavyweight mixed martial artists
Heavyweight mixed martial artists
Mixed martial artists utilizing Muay Thai
Mixed martial artists utilizing American Kenpo
Mixed martial artists utilizing Brazilian jiu-jitsu
Australian practitioners of Brazilian jiu-jitsu
People awarded a black belt in Brazilian jiu-jitsu
Australian people of Croatian descent
Sportspeople from Sydney
Living people
Australian expatriate sportspeople in the United States
Australian Muay Thai practitioners
Australian male karateka
Ultimate Fighting Championship male fighters